The Brown Derby is a chain of liquor stores located in and around Springfield, Missouri. The first Brown Derby was opened in Springfield in 1937 by John A. Morris. The Brown Derby is famous for being the first retail location for fishing lures and other fishing accessories sold by John L. Morris, the son of the Brown Derby's founder, and the future proprietor of the Springfield-based Bass Pro Shops. John L. Morris began selling fishing and other outdoor products from an 8×8 ft (2.4×2.4 m) section of his father's store and eventually incorporated Bass Pro Shops in 1972.

History
The first Brown Derby was opened in 1937 by John A. Morris, the father of John L. Morris, the creator and owner of the outdoor retail store chain Bass Pro Shop. The Brown Derby has grown to 18 locations in and around Springfield, Missouri, including the Brown Derby International Wine Center.

International Wine Center
The Brown Derby International Wine Center was opened in 1969.

References

 Dummit, Chris. (May 14, 1995) The Palm Beach Post Why the fuss to hook Bass Pro? Sport paradise would lure tourists." Page 1A.
 Walker, Larry (August 1995) Wines & Vines The retail scene - wine. Volume 76; Issue 8; page 18.
 Waters, Steve. (November 16, 1998) South Florida Sun-Sentinel Bass is business, for fun and profit. Section: Sports; Page 1D.
 Sasser, Ray. (March 21, 1999) The Dallas Morning News Geared for success: Johnny Morris, whose sixth Outdoor World superstore opens this week in Grapevine, has turned his passion into a sporting goods empire. Section: Sports day; Page 26B.
 Fort Worth Star-Telegram (February 20, 2005) Beyond Branson: So near the show-biz glitz and yet so far, Big Cedar Lodge is the place to kick back and enjoy nature. Just ask Bass Pro Shops founder John Morris. Page: H1.
 Tackett, Paul. (June 21, 2006) Tulsa World Fishy business.'' Section: Community; Page 1.

Companies based in Springfield, Missouri
Food and drink companies established in 1937
Privately held companies based in Missouri
Alcohol distribution retailers
1937 establishments in Missouri
Drink companies of the United States